Jacqueline Susan McKenzie (born 24 October 1967) is an Australian film and stage actress.

Early life
Born in Sydney, New South Wales, McKenzie attended Wenona School in North Sydney until 1983 then moved to Pymble Ladies' College, where she graduated in 1985 with her Higher School Certificate. Known at school for her fine singing voice, McKenzie was cast as Nancy in Oliver! then in Godspell (both a co-production with Shore School) and later in Brigadoon (a co-production with Knox Grammar School), sharing the stage with Hugh Jackman, who was a student at Knox at the time.

Career

Early years 
McKenzie studied for a Bachelor of Arts degree at the University of New South Wales. While at university, she began modelling. Represented by Cameron's Management, she worked in both print and television media. She also took regular singing lessons with  Australian vocal coach Bob Tasman-Smith. In 1987, McKenzie was cast as the lead in the pilot of television series All The Way alongside Ben Mendelsohn, Robert Mammone, Rowena Wallace and Martin Sacks. During this time, she came to the attention of casting agent Liz Mullinar, who had cast Judy Davis in My Brilliant Career and Nicole Kidman in Dead Calm. Following advice from Mullinar, McKenzie auditioned for the National Institute of Dramatic Art (NIDA) and was accepted. Opting out of both her arts degree and All The Way, McKenzie attended NIDA in 1988. She graduated in December 1990.

1991 to 1995
In 1991, McKenzie was awarded "Best Newcomer Award" from the Sydney Theatre Critics Circle, which recognized her chameleon-like ability and her consistently high-calibre work in theatre productions Child Dancing (as Julie-Ann), The Master Builder (as Kaja), Twelfth Night (as Viola) and Rebecca (as Mrs de Winter). During rehearsals for Rebecca, director George Ogilvie allowed McKenzie time off to audition for a new Australian Independent feature film called Romper Stomper set to star Russell Crowe. She was subsequently cast in the film and went on to win Best Actress award at the Film Critics Circle of Australia. Russell would later say "Jacqui's range as an actor disappears over the horizon. And I'm not sure it can actually be defined. When I first saw her, in the play Rebecca, I saw an actor whom I thought was blowing me on the skin from the inside. She is an actor who is both delicate and magical." In her "nothing short of stunning" film debut in Romper Stomper, McKenzie was described as "especially shining in her courage, truth and skill." The role garnered her attention overseas, where she won Best Actress at the 1992 Stockholm International Film Festival for her "stark and non-sentimental portrayal of a young woman whose life has turned into a desperate chase for all she has lost: love, serenity, identity. Her character plays an essential part in creating the inexorable force and impact of the film." Over the next couple of years, she came to be regarded as one of Australia's most promising young actresses of stage and screen, showcasing a "phenomenal emotional range".

In 1994, McKenzie starred alongside David Wenham, Geoffrey Rush and Richard Roxburgh in Shakespeare's Hamlet, directed by Neil Armfield, for Belvoir St Theatre, Sydney. This sellout production was a critical, award-winning success with McKenzie's performance "so exquisitely pitched it could have shattered glass". "Jacqueline McKenzie's fragile Ophelia, dressed in cottontails and a tail-coat, turning the stage into a mind-state of shattered glass. Her presence awesomely palpable because of its sheer intangibility." The production went on to tour to Melbourne but McKenzie was unable to continue due to other work commitments. (Cate Blanchett took over the role of Ophelia for the tour).

McKenzie's performance in Hamlet was followed by her role as Joan of Arc in Bernard Shaw's Saint Joan, directed by Gale Edwards for the Sydney Theatre Company at the Sydney Opera House. This was the first time Saint Joan had been staged in Australia since the Zoe Caldwell production in 1962. Regarded as one of "the most revealing tests of an actress", and as "the female Hamlet", Edwards' production was both a critical and box office sensation with McKenzie's performance unanimously acclaimed: "This play stands or falls on the performance of St Joan and McKenzie is simply superb." "From the moment she enters, she sets the stage ablaze. McKenzie is a Joan to make the theatrical heavens rejoice... McKenzie offers us Joan in all her innocence, ignorance, joyful goodness that seems to light her from within and, almost until the end, a youthful sense of fun. Her slight stature can seem waif thin, piteously vulnerable; but raging into battle she's tough and sturdy, a young woman of intense and convincing action. Always in focus, like an unwavering flame, is McKenzie's Joan the Maid" and "Here is a Joan with such fortitude and faith that seems hardly possible to exist within such a delicate frame. McKenzie's waif-like image conceals remarkable strength, and an almost inexhaustible supply of emotion. It is a Joan to inspire the tamest among us to stand up as individuals, and listen to the voices inside of us. Shaw himself would have been reluctantly impressed."

Described by head of NIDA, John Clarke, as "A chameleon" "one of the most talented actresses we have produced... she's an absolute dynamo, a powerhouse," McKenzie had fast earned a reputation as one of the most versatile actresses of her generation, taking on varied and often difficult roles. Equally adept in drama or comedy, she was described as the "Judy Davis of her generation (or funnily enough, the green eyed American actor Meg Ryan)" In 1992, Ben Elton cast her as the lead role of "Rachel", the feisty environmentalist, in the television adaptation of his hit novel Stark. The mini-series was a BBC/ABC comedy, was directed by Nadia Tass and co-starred Ben Elton and Colin Friels. McKenzie received an Australian Film Institute Award nomination for Best Actress in a Miniseries for the role. The same year (1993), she scored a Best Actress in a Feature Film nomination for her comedic turn in the indie comedy, This Won't Hurt a Bit, playing Vanessa Presscott, a nerdy English ingénue with a speech impediment. In 1994, McKenzie reunited with director George Ogilvie (who had directed her in Rebecca and Twelfth Night) to play the lead role of Dancy Smith in the adaptation of Kylie Tennant's famous depression-era drama The Battlers. The mini-series co-starred Gary Sweet and played on the Seven Network. McKenzie was nominated again for Best Actress in a TV Drama at the Australian Film Institute 1994 awards. That same year, McKenzie was also nominated for Best Supporting Actress in the feature film Traps, directed by Pauline Chan. Playing the French girl living in Colonial Vietnam, McKenzie got to showcase her versatility by speaking in both French and Vietnamese for the role.

In 1995, McKenzie made Australian Film Institute history by winning the Beyond Best Actress in a Leading Role for Angel Baby and the Beyond Best Actress Award in a TV Drama for Halifax f.p.: Lies of the Mind. She also won the Silver Logie for Most Outstanding Actress at the Logie Awards for her role in Halifax f.p. It was for playing the young lover Kate, opposite John Lynch's Harry in the Michael Rymer–helmed drama Angel Baby, that McKenzie received international acclaim: The LA Weekly reviewed: "McKenzie is a find. Whether using answers on the Wheel of Fortune as a kind of daily horoscope, or cringing in terror as the upright legs of chairs in an empty restaurant seem to whisper at her, she is blazingly equal to the extremes of animal panic and hyperconscious insight that are the north and south of this movie's humane compass." Angel Baby also featured actress Deborra-Lee Furness and Colin Friels. In 1996, McKenzie was awarded Australian Star of the Year at the Australian Movie Convention.

1996 to 2003 
McKenzie ventured to the US, where she starred in the films Deep Blue Sea (1999) directed by Renny Harlin with Samuel L. Jackson, Thomas Jane and Michael Rapaport; Divine Secrets of the Ya-Ya Sisterhood (2002) with Sandra Bullock, Ashley Judd, Ellen Burstyn, Kiersten Warren and James Garner; Freak Weather, with Aida Turturro and John Carroll Lynch; Love from Ground Zero with Simon Baker and Pruitt Taylor Vince, as well as tele-movie When Billie Beat Bobby, starring Holly Hunter and Ron Silver. She starred in the UK independent films Eisenstein with Simon McBurney and Kiss Kiss (Bang Bang) with Stellan Skarsgård, Chris Penn and Paul Bettany.

In 2001, McKenzie was given a United States green card in March 2001 for "Person of Extraordinary Ability". She made her US theatre debut, starring as Rita in Willy Russell's Educating Rita, at the Williamstown Theatre Festival directed by Bruce Paltrow and co-starring Edward Herrmann. It was a huge success. "This production had the inexhaustible talents of Jacqueline McKenzie, an utterly charming and irrepressible Australian, whose cockney accent was spot on and characterization was full-cocked. Bursting onto the stage like a fire-engine responding to a five-alarm conflagration, McKenzie was a dynamo with enough energy to fill simultaneous performances of this and Pygmalion (a sure bet for her if the WTF wants to bring her back – and it should). Suffice to say, hers will surely be among the most memorable and reason enough to revive Rita."

She was cast as a lead in the US television pilot for ABC called MEDS (later MDs), directed by Michael Hoffman and starring John Hannah. She played Dockdaisy in the National Actors Theatre / Complicite co-production of The Resistible Rise of Arturo Ui, by Bertolt Brecht. Directed by Simon McBurney this cast included Al Pacino, Steve Buscemi, Chazz Palminteri, John Goodman, Paul Giamatti, Billy Crudup, Lothaire Bluteau, Linda Emond, Tony Randall and Charles Durning. After this production, McKenzie returned to Australia to star as Catherine in the Pulitzer Prize Winning play Proof by David Auburn. Directed by George Ogilvie and starring Barry Otto, Christina Eliason, and Jonny Pasvolsky, this "tour de force from McKenzie" broke all previously held box office records at the Sydney Opera House, Drama Theatre. Mckenzie followed the success of Proof by taking the lead role of Jude in the Australian feature film Peaches, starring Hugo Weaving and Emma Lung. Directed by Craig Monahan, the role garnered McKenzie a Best Actress Award from the Film Critics Circle of Australia with her performance described as a "revelation": "never more so than in the scene where she sings 'The Carnival Is Over' across a pub counter." From Peaches, McKenzie began work with Paul Cox (Man of Flowers, Innocence) in the feature film Human Touch starring as a young chorister estranged from her husband: "McKenzie makes Anna's sensual awakening both sensual and real".

2004 to 2015 
In 2004, McKenzie made the switch to prime-time television in a role that would catapult her to international stardom. Cast as the lead female detective Diana Skouris in the US prime-time science fiction television series The 4400 from Executive Producer Francis Ford Coppola, McKenzie was cast alongside Joel Gretsch (Taken, Minority Report) – an onscreen partnership oft likened to Mulder and Scully. Directed by Yves Simoneau with show runner Ira Steven Behr (Star Trek: Deep Space Nine), The 4400 was the highest-rated debut on US cable for 2004, earning a Primetime Emmy Award nomination for Best Mini-Series. The show ran on the USA Network for four seasons, ending in 2007. In 2006, McKenzie also starred as Linda Landry in "Umney's Last Case" opposite William H. Macy – the third episode of Nightmares and Dreamscapes on TNT. In 2008, McKenzie starred as psychiatrist Veronica Hayden-Jones in the 13-part series Mental on the Fox Network, which was filmed at Fox Telecolombia in Bogotá, Colombia. Starring Annabella Sciorra, this was the first American television series to be filmed in Latin America for international markets. McKenzie guest starred in Desperate Housewives, Without a Trace, CSI: Miami, Hawaii 5-0 and the Australian TV series Rake. She was cast as Emma Waddell in the Jeremy Sims–directed feature film Beneath Hill 60 and starred in the 2010 season finale of NCIS: Los Angeles alongside former Deep Blue Sea castmate LL Cool J.

In 2011, Cate Blanchett and Andrew Upton, the co-artistic directors of the Sydney Theatre Company, invited McKenzie to star in their production of Sarah Ruhl's In the Next Room (or The Vibrator Play) at the Sydney Opera House, Drama Theatre. Co-starring Mandy McElhinney, this production went on tour to Melbourne Theatre Company, Wollongong, Canberra and Parramatta Riverside Theatre, earning McKenzie a Best Actress nomination at the Green Room Awards for her role as Mrs Givings. This was McKenzie's first play since her critically acclaimed turn as Catherine in David Auburn's Pulitzer Prize–winning play Proof, which sold out at the Sydney Opera House in 2003.

In 2012, she accepted Cate Blanchett and Andrew Upton's invitation to star in the Australian premiere of the two-hander Sex With Strangers by American playwright Laura Eason (House of Cards) for the Sydney Theatre Company. This critically acclaimed production co-starred Ryan Corr and was directed by Jocelyn Moorhouse. An award-winning director of many films including How to Make an American Quilt, this was Jocelyn's first play.

In 2013, McKenzie starred in the seminal role of Margaret (a.k.a. Maggie) in Cat on a Hot Tin Roof by Tennessee Williams for Belvoir St., directed by Simon Stone, co-starring Ewen Leslie (as Brick) and Marshall Napier (as Big Daddy). A sell-out production with an extension season at the Theatre Royal, Sydney, McKenzie's performance, in the role that made Elizabeth Taylor famous, was highly acclaimed: "Jacqueline McKenzie has far more scope in this play than she had in the recent Sex with Strangers to display her mesmerizing and neurasthenic talents that are so reminiscent of the early Judy Davis. She squirms, hops, skips and flops through the drama with a manic intensity that is breathtaking to watch from the first scene when she works her way through about a dozen changes of clothing and many pairs of 'hot' shoes during her long and intense opening monologue" and "McKenzie has been playing some major roles in Sydney recently but here is a great one, finally worthy of her ability, and she rises to it magnificently. Her Maggie is full of feverish energy, and hard-won, hard-edged glamour that a woman who has clawed herself up out of poverty to become the wife of the descendant of a crass but very rich family might be expected to display. She is better than them. She is beautiful, her smile is always bright but brief glimpses of self-doubt betray her origins, and her eyes betray her desperation." "This is a good production, made great by McKenzie's beautiful performance."

McKenzie returned to the Sydney Opera House in 2014 to play Liza in Andrew Upton's adaptation of the Gorky classic Children of the Sun for the Sydney Theatre Company. Co-starring with Justine Clarke and Toby Truslove, under the direction of Kip Williams, the production was immensely successful, garnering McKenzie a nomination for Best Actress at the 2014 Sydney Theatre Awards.

In 2014, McKenzie reunited with her Romper Stomper co-star, Russell Crowe, to perform in his feature-film-directing debut, The Water Diviner, in which he also stars. With a handpicked cast that included Yılmaz Erdoğan, Olga Kurylenko, Ryan Corr, Jai Courtney, Steve Bastoni and Cem Yılmaz, The Water Diviner was nominated for eight AACTA awards including Best Supporting Actress in a feature film for McKenzie, who played the role of Russell's grieving wife Lizzie. For this performance, McKenzie won Best Supporting Actress at the 2014 Film Critics Circle of Australia Awards.

Films to be released: Force of Destiny, written and directed by Paul Cox and starring David Wenham and Shahana Goswami. This will premiere at the Melbourne International Film Festival; Fell, written and directed by Kasimir Burgess and starring Matt Nable and Daniel Henshall.

In 2015, McKenzie starred alongside Richard Roxburgh and Cate Blanchett in the Sydney Theatre Company production of The Present, by Anton Chekhov. Adapted by Andrew Upton, this production was directed by John Crowley. That production moved in 2016/17 to the Ethel Barrymore Theatre in Manhattan for the Broadway debut of McKenzie and the rest of the cast. She also starred as Orlando in the Sarah Ruhl play Orlando, based on the novel by Virginia Woolf (made famous by the 1992 film directed by Sally Potter and starring Tilda Swinton). Directed by Sarah Goodes, Orlando ran at the Sydney Opera House for the Sydney Theatre Company.

McKenzie was nominated for Best Actress in Orlando and Best Supporting Actress in The Present at the 2015 Sydney Theatre Awards.

2016 to present 
In 2016, McKenzie reunited with her former Stark! co-star Ben Elton for his romantic comedy Three Summers filming in Perth. The ensemble also featured Robert Sheean, Magda Szubanski, Michael Caton and Rebecca Breeds.

In August 2016 McKenzie filmed the independent movie Harmony in Wollongong and Sydney, Australia.

McKenzie starred as Jane Chandler in Australian feature film The Gateway in October 2016. Written by  Michael White and directed by John Soto, the sci-fi film also starred Myles Pollard and Ben Mortley. The film follows the journey of a particle physicist who, grieving over the loss of her husband in a car crash, uses a revolutionary machine to bring him back with dire consequences for her family.

In May 2017, SBS announced that McKenzie had been cast in their new four-part drama Safe Harbour about a group of Australians who come across a boat of refugees whilst sailing on vacation. The mini-series, produced by Matchbox Pictures, also stars Phoebe Tonkin, Ewen Leslie and Joel Jackson.

In June 2017 McKenzie began filming Luke Sparke's movie Occupation (film) with Charles Mesure, Temeura Morrison and Dan Ewing about a group of town residents banding together after a devastating ground invasion.

In August 2017, McKenzie started shooting the TV series Romper Stomper, a follow-up to the 1992 cult classic movie in which she starred with Russell Crowe. The series, conceived and directed by Geoffrey Wright (creator of the original film) and produced by John Edwards, premiered on Australian streaming platform Stan on New Years Day 2018, breaking all records for original content. The series is due to air in the United Kingdom on the BBC later in 2018. For her role in the series McKenzie was awarded a Logie for Most Outstanding Supporting Actress at the Logie Awards of 2018.

At the CinefestOZ awards in August 2017, McKenzie was honoured with the Screen Legend Award, recognising her contribution and excellence in the film industry.

Starred alongside Sam Neill, Greta Scacchi and Bryan Brown in the movie Palm Beach (2019) . This was directed by Rachel Ward.

Reunited with friends from drama school, Essie Davis and Daniel Lapaine, on the hit film Miss Fisher and the Crypt of Tears (a spinoff of the series Miss Fisher Murder Mysteries)

2019 saw Jacqueline return to the Sydney Theatre Company to play Alice in Lucy Kirkwood's Mosquitoes (play) at the Sydney Opera House. In 2020,  she starred in series 2 of the Stan original series Bloom alongside Jackie Weaver and Bryan Brown.  She also reprised her award-winning role "Sharon Sinclair", from the series Halifax f.p., in the reboot Halifax: Retribution .

In 2021, McKenzie appeared with Annabelle Wallis in James Wan's horror film Malignant, and starred alongside Jane Seymour in Australia feature film Ruby's Choice.

Music
McKenzie's hobbies include composing and recording music. Past collaborators include Vic Levak (Balligomingo) who co-wrote "Shy Baby" and Jim Hayden (Electrasy). When her 4400 co-star Joel Gretsch heard her song "Shy Baby", he took it to the producers of the show and as a result, it was used in the second-season finale "Mommy's Bosses" of The 4400. "Shy Baby" went on to be included in The 4400 soundtrack CD, released in April 2007.

Art and painting 
An avid painter (since working with Aaron Blabey on the Paul Cox film The Human Touch), McKenzie's paintings have appeared in several publications, including Venice Magazine and OK!.

In the Fox TV series Mental, her paintings became set dressing, adorning the walls of her character's office in the final episodes of the show.

Personal life
In 1996, a portrait of McKenzie by Australian narrative painter Garry Shead was a finalist in the Archibald Prize and the Doug Moran National Portrait Prize.

She is a former partner of actor Simon McBurney. She has a daughter.

Filmography

Film

Television

Theatre
Oliver! as Nancy, school production
1991: Child Dancing as Julie-Ann, Griffin Theatre Company, dir. Michael Gow
1991: Twelfth Night as Viola, dir. George Ogilvie, Q Theatre Penrith
1991: The Master Builder as Kaja Fosli, Belvoir, dir. Neil Armfield
1991: Rebecca as Mrs de Winter, Marian Street Theatre, dir. George Ogilvie
1992: The Barber of Seville as Rosine, Marian Street Theatre, dir. Peter Kingston
1992: Vassa (Maxim Gorky) (as Natalia, NIDA, dir. John Clarke
1994: Hamlet as Ophelia, Company B (Sydney) and Playhouse (Melbourne), dir. Neil Armfield, with Geoffrey Rush, David Wenham, Richard Roxburgh, Gillian Jones
1995: Saint Joan as Joan, Sydney Theatre Company, Sydney Opera House dir. Gale Edwards
1997: The Governor's Family as Lara Mountgarrett, Belvoir, dir. Neil Armfield
2000: The White Devil as Isabella, Sydney Theatre Company and Brooklyn Academy of Music (2001), dir. Gale Edwards, with Angie Milliken, Marcus Graham, Jeremy Sims, Julia Blake, Bruce Spence, Hugo Weaving, Philip Quast, Paula Arundell
2001: Educating Rita as Rita, Williamstown Theatre Festival, dir. Bruce Paltrow, with Edward Herrmann
2002:The Resistible Rise of Arturo Ui as Dock Daisy, Schimmel Center (New York), Complicite, dir. Simon McBurney, with Al Pacino, Steve Buscemi, John Goodman, Billy Crudup Paul Giamatti, Tony Randall, Charles Durning, Linda Emond, Chazz Palminteri, Dominic Chianese, Lothaire Bluteau
2003: Proof as Catherine, by David Auburn, Sydney Opera House dir. George Ogilvie, with Barry Otto
2011: In the Next Room (or The Vibrator Play) by Sarah Ruhl, as Catherine Givings, Sydney Opera House and Melbourne Theatre Company, dir. Pamela Rabe
2012: Sex with Strangers by Laura Eason, as Olivia, Sydney Theatre Company, dir. Jocelyn Moorhouse
2013: Cat on a Hot Tin Roof as Margaret, Maggie the Cat. Belvoir, dir. Simon Stone
2014: Children of the Sun by Maxim Gorky as Liza, dir: Kip Williams adapted by Andrew Upton, Sydney Theatre Company, Sydney Opera House
2015: The Present by Anton Chekhov as Sophia, adapted by Andrew Upton, Sydney Theatre Company dir. John Crowley; at the Sydney Theatre; in 2016/17 at the Ethel Barrymore Theatre in Manhattan
2015: Orlando as Orlando, adapted from Virginia Woolf's Orlando: A Biography by Sarah Ruhl, Sydney Theatre Company, Sydney Opera House
2019: Mosquitoes by Lucy Kirkwood as Alice. Dir: Jessica Arthur for Sydney Theatre Company, Sydney Opera House.

Awards and nominations

References

External links

Profile by Veronica Hayden-Jones, Global BC, 21 May 2009
STC Profile at the Sydney Theatre Company September 2014
"10 Questions: Jacqueline McKenzie, actress, 46" by Michael Bodey, The Australian, 6 September 2014
"Children of the Sun review: Female stars set Kip Williams' stage alight" by Jason Blake, The Sydney Morning Herald, September 2014
"IGN interview: The 4400s Jacqueline McKenzie" by Eric Goldman, IGN, 24 August 2006
"Can 4400s Diana See the Future?" by Matt Webb Mitovich, TV Guide, 2 June 2006
"On Duty", The Daily Telegraph (Sydney), 11 June 2011
"Proof", review, The Sydney Morning Herald, 16 June 2003
"Hot blush" by Catherine Keenan, The Sydney Morning Herald, 14 June 2003
"Entertain us: Jacqueline McKenzie", interview by Nathan Olivieri, The Sydney Morning Herald, 17 February 2013
Russell Crowe casting his directorial debut
The Water Diviner with stills shot

1967 births
20th-century Australian actresses
21st-century Australian actresses
Actresses from Sydney
Australian expatriate actresses in the United States
Australian film actresses
Australian people of English descent
Australian people of Irish descent
Australian people of Scottish descent
Australian Shakespearean actresses
Australian television actresses
Best Actress AACTA Award winners
Living people
Logie Award winners
National Institute of Dramatic Art alumni
People educated at Pymble Ladies' College